WSLB (1400 AM) is a sports radio station, operating from Ogdensburg, New York, United States. Prior to switching to a sports format, WSLB was an oldies radio station. WSLB is the affiliate of ESPN Radio for the St. Lawrence County area.

History
WSLB began broadcasting in 1940 as the Mutual Broadcasting System affiliate in Ogdensburg. The station switched to NBC in the early 1990s when it entered into a three-way simulcast with sister stations WIGS (1230) and WGIX (95.3) in Gouverneur, New York with an oldies format as "FSR -- Full-Service Radio. WIGS went off the air permanently in the mid-1990s and the two remaining stations simulcasted until WSLB took a conservative talk format as "Talk 1400" a few years ago. In 2006, the station picked up the ESPN Radio affiliation on weekends before going full-time beginning Saturday, December 1, 2007, dropping its talk format. On December 3, 2007, WQTK began running a similar talk format to the one that had once aired on WSLB.

External links
WSLB official website

SLB
Sports radio stations in the United States
Radio stations established in 1940